The rivière Cachée (English: Hidden River) is a tributary of the Mauvaise River flowing in the town of Saint-Raymond, in the Portneuf Regional County Municipality, in the administrative region of Capitale-Nationale, in Quebec, in Canada.

The Cachée river valley is served by a few forest roads for the needs of forestry and recreational tourism activities.

The main economic activities in the sector are forestry; recreotourism activities, second.

The surface of the Hidden River (except the rapids areas) is generally frozen from the beginning of December to the end of March, but safe circulation on the ice is generally made from the end of December to the beginning of March. The water level of the river varies with the seasons and the precipitation; the spring flood occurs in March or April.

Geography 
The Cachée river has its source at the confluence of Lac Caché (altitude ). The mouth of this lake is located at:
  north-west of the confluence of the Cachée river and the Bras du Nord;
  north-west of Saint-Raymond;
  north-west of the St. Lawrence River.

  first on  towards the south in particular by crossing on  a small forest lake, then on  eastward across Lake Renversi, to its mouth. Note: Lake Renversi has a marsh area in its western part which is bounded by two opposite peninsulas. This lake also receives on the west side the outlet of Lac No Good;
  to the east in a deep valley, to the outlet (coming from the south) of Lac Morasse and Petit Lac Morasse;
  to the east in a well-steep valley bending to the south-east by skirting a mountain, to the outlet of "Les Trois Petits Lacs";
  north-east in a small plain, to its mouth.

The mouth of the Cachée river flows on the west bank of the Mauvaise River, that is to the south side of the hamlet "Rivière-Mauvaise". This confluence is located at:
  north-east of a mountain peak (altitude: ;
  west of the mouth of the Bad River and the Bras du Nord;
  north-west of the route 365 bridge which passes through downtown Saint-Raymond;
  north of the confluence of the Sainte-Anne River and the Saint Lawrence river.

From the mouth of the Cachée River, the current flows successively in the following segments, over:
  following the course of the Mauvaise River;
  generally towards the south following the course of the Bras du Nord;
  generally south and southwest following the course of the Sainte-Anne river, to the northwest shore of the Saint Lawrence river.

Toponymy 
The toponym Rivière Cachée was formalized on December 5, 1968, at the Place Names Bank of the Commission de toponymie du Québec.

See also 

 Portneuf Regional County Municipality
 Mauvaise River
 Bras du Nord
 Sainte-Anne River (Mauricie)
 List of rivers of Quebec

References

Bibliography

External links 
 

Rivers of Capitale-Nationale